The SsangYong Tivoli (Korean: 쌍용 티볼리) is a subcompact crossover SUV made by the SsangYong Motor Company. It is SsangYong's first new model under Mahindra & Mahindra ownership. It is named after the Italian town of Tivoli, Lazio, and was chosen because it can be read as "I love it" in reverse.

History
The Tivoli was in testing and development for the three years prior to its announcement in November 2014 and was revealed in concept with the project name X100. It was launched in South Korea in January 2015.

The Tivoli is offered with a choice of petrol or diesel 1.6-liter engines and is available in two or four-wheel drive. It is equipped with a six-speed manual or AISIN automatic gearbox, which SsangYong claims is as quick and efficient as a dual-clutch setup.

Facelift
In May 2019, SsangYong revealed a teaser image and main specs of the first facelift of the Tivoli. The new version of the car was launched on June 4 in South Korea.

The facelifted Tivoli received a new exterior design, including new LED headlights, fog lights and new taillight graphics. The dashboard also reshaped, with a new centre stack, air vents, a 10.25-inch digital instrument cluster, and a 9.0-inch central infotainment system compatible with Apple CarPlay and Android Auto.

The updated Tivoli features a new 1.5-liter turbo petrol engine, which will replace the existing 1.6-liter petrol engine.

Tivoli XLV 
The SsangYong Tivoli XLV (sold in South Korea as the SsangYong Tivoli Air) is an extended version of the Tivoli. The XLV is offered with all-wheel drive and a 1.6-liter diesel engine.

Safety
The Tivoli equipped with seven airbags, including a driver knee-airbag. It also features smart safety driving system including Autonomous Emergency Brake System, (AEBS), Forward Collision Warning System (FCWS), Lane Departure Warning System (LDWS), Lane Keeping Assist System (LKAS), High Beam Assist (HBA), and Traffic Sign Recognition (TSR).

KNCAP
In Korean New Car Assessment Program (KNCAP) the SsangYong Tivoli received top safety rating of Grade 1 (5 stars; 91.9 pts.) on a 2015 registration.

Euro NCAP & ANCAP
The rating for the SsangYong Tivoli was first published in 2016.  At that time, autonomous emergency braking was sold as an option, as part of a safety pack, and Euro NCAP published two ratings: one with only standard equipment and another with the safety pack.  Since February 2018, the content of the safety pack - AEB City, AEB Inter-urban and AEB Pedestrian - has been made standard equipment and the rating has been changed to reflect this change.

Euro NCAP test results for a LHD, 5-door hatchback variant with standard equipment on a 2016 registration:

Awards 
In 2015, the Tivoli selected as the Safe car of the year by the Ministry of Land, Infrastructure and Transport of South Korea.

In 2016, The car was chosen as the Family Car of the Year by VAB, the largest automobile association in Belgium, despite SsangYong being a relatively unknown brand selling only 619 cars in Belgium throughout 2014, representing a market share of 0.13%.

Motorsport
 In Dakar 2018, Óscar Fuertes and co-driver Diego Vallejo entered rally with a Tivoli DKR. Over  of racing, Fuertes and Vallejo finished the rally in a 32nd place on their very first Dakar Rally. They were also 4th in the T1.3 category (petrol vehicles with 2WD).

References

External links 

 
  (XLV)

2020s cars
Compact sport utility vehicles
Crossover sport utility vehicles
Mini sport utility vehicles
Euro NCAP small family cars
Front-wheel-drive vehicles
All-wheel-drive vehicles
Tivoli
Cars introduced in 2015